The Green Prince may refer to:

 The Green Prince, a 2000 novel by Sophie Masson
 Green Prince, an alias of Mosab Hassan Yousef, a Palestinian who spied for Israel; also the title of a 2014 documentary film about him
 The Green Prince (film), a 2014 German documentary film directed by Nadav Schirman